Matt Hanson (born 17 September 1971) is an author, film producer, and film director, specializing in digital art. He has created a series of projects which investigate cinema's possible futures, including A Swarm of Angels, onedotzero, and book projects including The End of Celluloid. As creator of A Swarm of Angels he has become concerned with issues relating to Creative Commons, free culture, Open source culture, crowdsourcing, and file sharing.

Background 

Matt Hanson is a filmmaker who created the onedotzero digital film festival & organisation, and is the author of a series of books on digital film, including The End of Celluloid: Film Futures in the Digital Age.

He has made a multitude of successful and innovative short films (including the award-winning Salaryman 6, with Jake Knight, and City of Hollow Mountains with The Light Surgeons), television series for Channel 4 (UK), and is considered an expert in moving image trends.

As an advocate of digital film and alternative moving image in the 1990s he championed and showcased UK premieres of work by then relative unknowns Spike Jonze, Chris Cunningham, Michel Gondry and Jonathan Glazer.

He is the originator of the Creative Commons-licensed film project A Swarm of Angels.

A Screen International article cited him as an 'international film visionary'. Forbes listed him among 'Ten People Who Could Change The World' in 2007.

He was chosen as a participant in the inaugural Creators Series 2007, a showcase of emerging creativity and ideas in New York and Los Angeles by Tomorrow Unlimited.

Bibliography 
Books published include:
 The End of Celluloid: Film Futures in the Digital Age, Rotovision, 2004
 Motion Blur: Graphic Moving Imagemakers, Laurence King, 2004
 Sci-Fi Moviescapes, Rotovision, 2005
 Reinventing Music Video, Rotovision, 2006
Contributed to:
 On Air: A Visual History of MTV, DGV, 2005

External links 

 Matt Hanson's website
 A Swarm of Angels website
 Eternal Gaze blog
 Form in Motion, Adobe Think Tank Interview
 
 The Future of Cinema: Matt Hanson discusses A Swarm of Angels, Assignment Zero, Wired Crowdfunding Journalism project
 A Swarm of Angels Crowdsourcing film production interview, The Social Web zdnet blog

English film directors
English film producers
English non-fiction writers
Living people
1971 births
English male non-fiction writers
Creative Commons-licensed authors